Henry Porter Baldwin (February 22, 1814 – December 31, 1892), a descendant of pilgrim father Nathaniel Baldwin, was the 15th governor of Michigan and U.S. Senator from the state of Michigan.

Early life in Rhode Island
Baldwin was born to John and Margaret (Williams) Baldwin in Coventry, Rhode Island, and attended the common schools. He worked as a store clerk in Pawtucket from age 12 to age 20, after which he engaged in his own business for several years in Woonsocket. In 1835, he married Harriet M. Day (deceased 1862). He married his second wife, Sibyle Lambard, in 1866, who survived him.

Life and politics in Michigan
Baldwin moved to Detroit, Michigan, where he established a wholesale business in boots and shoes in 1838. He was a member of the convention which organized the U.S. Republican Party in Jackson, Michigan, in 1854. He was influential in organizing the sixth Episcopal parish in the northern outskirts of Detroit on December 27, 1858, and in building St. John's Episcopal Church for the parish. Baldwin donated the church lot and underwrote a large portion of the cost of building a chapel to seat 125 persons (completed November 1859) and paid for the construction of the rectory. He also contributed in large part to the building of the larger 1,300-seat nave, completed in 1861. He was the Senior Warden from the parish's founding until his death.

He was director of the Michigan State Bank and president of the Second National Bank of Detroit, 1863–1887. For several years, he was also the director of the Eastern Asylum in Pontiac. He was a member of the Michigan State Senate, 2nd District, 1861–1862. He married his second wife, Sibyle Lambard, on November 21, 1866.

In 1868, Baldwin was elected Governor of Michigan, serving from 1869 to 1873. He was appointed and subsequently elected as a Republican to the United States Senate to fill the vacancy caused by the death of Zachariah Chandler, serving from November 17, 1879 to March 3, 1881, alongside Thomas W. Ferry. He became Chairman of the Michigan Republican Party from 1880 to 1882. The city of Baldwin, Michigan was named for him during his time as governor.

Retirement and death
Baldwin was not a candidate for reelection to the Senate and resumed his former business pursuits, serving as president of the Detroit National Bank, 1883–1887. He died in Detroit on December 31, 1892, and is interred in Elmwood Cemetery.

References

External links
 
The Political Graveyard
St. John's Episcopal Church, founded by Gov. Baldwin

1814 births
1892 deaths
People from Kent County, Rhode Island
Republican Party governors of Michigan
Republican Party Michigan state senators
19th-century American Episcopalians
Republican Party United States senators from Michigan
Burials at Elmwood Cemetery (Detroit)
19th-century American politicians